Julien Lyneel (born 15 April 1990) is a French former professional volleyball player. He was a member of the France national team from 2011 to 2021. The 2015 European Champion, and a two–time World League winner (2015, 2017).

Career

Clubs
In July 2015, he signed a contract with the Polish team, Asseco Resovia.

National team
He debuted in the French national team in 2011. On 18 October 2015, the French national team, including Lyneel, achieved a title of the 2015 European Champion with a 3–0 win against Slovenia in the final.

Honours

Clubs
 National championships
 2015/2016  Polish Championship, with Asseco Resovia
 2017/2018  Chinese Championship, with Shanghai Golden Age
 2021/2022  French Championship, with Montpellier Volley

References

External links

 
 Player profile at LegaVolley.it 
 Player profile at PlusLiga.pl 
 Player profile at Volleybox.net

1990 births
Living people
Sportspeople from Montpellier
French men's volleyball players
French expatriate sportspeople in Poland
Expatriate volleyball players in Poland
French expatriate sportspeople in Italy
Expatriate volleyball players in Italy
French expatriate sportspeople in China
Expatriate volleyball players in China
Resovia (volleyball) players
Jastrzębski Węgiel players
Outside hitters